A yoke, alternatively known as a control wheel or a control column, is a device used for piloting some fixed-wing aircraft.

The pilot uses the yoke to control the attitude of the plane, usually in both pitch and roll. Rotating the control wheel controls the ailerons and the roll axis. Fore and aft movement of the control column controls the elevator and the pitch axis. When the yoke is pulled back, the nose of the aircraft rises. When the yoke is pushed forward, the nose is lowered. When the yoke is turned left, the plane rolls to the left, and when it is turned to the right, the plane rolls to the right.

Small to medium-size aircraft, usually limited to propeller-driven, feature a mechanical system whereby the yoke is connected directly to the control surfaces with cables and rods. Human muscle power alone is not enough for larger and more powerful aircraft, so hydraulic systems are used, in which yoke movements control hydraulic valves and actuators. In more modern aircraft, inputs may first be sent to a fly-by-wire system, which then sends a corresponding signal to actuators attached to the control surfaces. Yokes may feature a stick shaker, which is designed to help indicate the onset of stall, or even a stick pusher, which physically pushes the yoke to prevent a stall.

Styles

Yokes come in a variety of shapes and sizes, the most common being of a "U" or "W" design. Some aircraft use a "ram's horn" style yoke, shaped like an "M", such as Embraer aircraft and the Concorde. There are some rarer exotic or archaic styles, such as circular or semi-circular designs, much like a steering wheel.

In larger aircraft they are usually mounted on a post protruding vertically from the floor, referred to as a control column. In most other planes, they are mounted on a horizontal tube that comes out of the instrument panel.

In the case of the Cirrus SR20 and Cirrus SR22, although the control looks like a side stick, it works like a yoke handle (referred to in the industry as a "side yoke"). The Cessna 162 uses a similar device.

Advantages and disadvantages

Side-sticks and centre-sticks are better for making rapid control inputs and dealing with high g-forces, hence their use in military, sport, and aerobatic aircraft. However, yokes are less sensitive (i.e., more precise) due to a larger range of motion and provide more visual feedback to the pilot.

Most yokes are connected and will both move together, thus providing instant indication to the other pilot when one makes a control input.  This is in contrast to some fly-by-wire control sticks that allow each pilot to send different, and sometimes greatly conflicting, inputs. Competing inputs are signaled on Airbus craft.

Yokes take up more room than side-sticks in the cockpit and may even obscure some instruments; by comparison, side-sticks have minimal cockpit intrusion, allowing the inclusion of retractable tray-tables and making it easier to enter/leave small cockpits.

A yoke, unlike a side-stick, may be used comfortably with either hand. This can be useful if one needs to write or manipulate other controls in the cockpit. This advantage is shared with the center-stick.

Ancillary functions
The yoke often incorporates other key functions such as housing thumb or finger buttons to enable the radio microphone, disengage the autopilot, and trim the aircraft. In addition, there may be a clipboard, checklist, or chronometer located in the yoke's center.

Alternative control systems
Yokes are not used on all aircraft. Helicopters use a cyclic and the majority of military fighter aircraft use a center or side-stick. Some light aircraft use a stick due to pilot preference. The latest Airbus family of passenger jets use a side-stick, similar to a joystick, to actuate control surfaces.

There are also computer input devices designed to simulate a yoke, intended for flight simulators.

See also
 Aircraft flight control system
 HOTAS, Hands On Throttle-And-Stick
 Joystick, computer input device
 Steering wheel

References

Aircraft controls